Skia or SKIA may refer to:

 Skia (typeface), a humanist sans-serif typeface
 Skia Graphics Engine, a software library that provides functionality for computer graphics operations
 Shade (mythology) (classical Greek skia, Greek: σκιά), the spirit or ghost of a dead person, residing in the underworld
 South Kerry Independent Alliance, former name of an Irish political party
 SKIA College, Philippines

See also
 Skias, settlement in ancient Arcadia
 Skia Dwa or Golden Stool, royal and divine throne of the Ashanti people